is a Japanese sprinter. She finished fourth in the 4 × 400 metres relay at the 2015 Asian Championships. She was also the reserve relay member at the 2019 World Relays but was not selected to run.

Personal bests

International competition

References

External links

Sayaka Oishi at Cerespo 
Sayaka Oishi at Greater-Morioka Sports Commission 

1991 births
Living people
Japanese female sprinters
Sportspeople from Iwate Prefecture